The 2013 Belgian Super Cup was a football match that was played on 21 July 2013, between 2012–13 Belgian Pro League winners Anderlecht and 2012–13 Belgian Cup winners Genk.

Match details

References

See also
Belgian Supercup

Belgian Super Cup 2013
Belgian Super Cup 2013
Belgian Super Cup, 2013
Belgian Supercup
July 2013 sports events in Europe